Ibrahim Salim Saad (born 1972) is an Iraqi international football goalkeeper.

Club career 
In the 1990s he was playing in Lebanon, before returning to Iraq where he played first in Salahaddin FC and, after one season, moved to Al-Talaba. In the winter-break of the 2000–2001 season, Ibrahim went to Serbia and played half a season in the Second League club FK Dubočica from Leskovac, where he had 12 league appearances. In 2001, he signed for Arbil FC, before moving, in 2002 to Yemen to represent the capital Sana'a club Al-Wahda.

International career 
Ibrahim Salim Saad was a part of the Iraq national football team. Among others, he participated in the so-called Agony of Doha match, held in Doha, Qatar on 28 October 1993, between Iraq and Japan, It was a qualification game for the 1994 FIFA World Cup, that finished in a 2–2 draw, and in which Saad was the Iraqi goalkeeper. Unfortunately for him, Iraq ended up not qualifying. He also played in the same qualifiers against PR Korea Saudi Arabia and Iran.

References

External sources 

1972 births
Living people
Iraqi footballers
Iraq international footballers
Iraqi expatriate footballers
Association football goalkeepers
Expatriate footballers in Lebanon
FK Dubočica players
Expatriate footballers in Serbia and Montenegro
Al-Shorta SC players
Iraqi expatriate sportspeople in Lebanon
Lebanese Premier League players